Umm al-Tut  (literally "mum-berries") is a Palestinian village in the West Bank, located 6 km southeast of the city of Jenin in the northern West Bank. According to the Palestinian Central Bureau of Statistics, the town had a population of  1,003 inhabitants in mid-year 2006.

History
In 1870, Umm al-Tut, called Oumm et-Toutah, situated south of   Deir Abu Da'if,  was one of the villages  Victor Guérin noted from Faqqua. 

In 1882,  the PEF's  Survey of Western Palestine described the village as resembling El Mughair, and that it stood "amongst dense thickets on the north and west, and has open plough-land on the south."

British Mandate era
In the 1922 census of Palestine conducted by the British Mandate authorities, Umm al-Tut had a population 94 Muslims, increasing  in the 1931 census to 129 Muslims, in  a total of 24 houses.

In   1945 statistics   the population was 170  Muslims, with 4,876 dunams of land, according to an official land and population survey.  Of this, 132  dunams were used for plantations and irrigable land, 1,705  dunams were for cereals, while a total of  6 dunams were built-up, urban land.

Jordanian era
Following the 1948 Arab–Israeli War, and the subsequent 1949 Armistice Agreements, Umm al-Tut came under Jordanian rule.

The Jordanian census of 1961 found 266 inhabitants in Um Tut.

Post-1967
Since  the 1967 Six-Day War Umm al-Tut has been under  Israeli occupation.

The village is  a major center of natural resources, nearby villages use 10% of Umm al-Tut's abundant surplus of fuel wood and also rely on Umm al-Tut's many pastures to raise their livestock.   Because of this, Umm al-Tut is under notably ample pressure due to increases in illegal/unauthorized grazing, logging, hunting, and waste disposal, as well as unlawful seizures of property by neighboring villages to convert into agricultural stock.

References

Bibliography

External links
Welcome To Umm al-Tut
Umm al-Tut, Welcome to Palestine
Survey of Western Palestine, Map 9:  IAA, Wikimedia commons

Villages in the West Bank
Jenin Governorate
Municipalities of the State of Palestine